The list of ship launches in 1858 includes a chronological list of some ships launched in 1858.


References

1858
Ship launches